"Dil To Hai Dil" is a song by playback singer Lata Mangeshkar from the 1978 Bollywood movie Muqaddar Ka Sikandar. The song was written by Anjaan and composed by Kalyanji Anandji.

References

Hindi film songs
Lata Mangeshkar songs
Songs with lyrics by Anjaan
Songs with music by Kalyanji–Anandji
1978 songs